BattleBots: Beyond the BattleBox is a video game based on the BattleBots license for the Game Boy Advance. It was developed by Cave+Barn Studios and Pipe Dream Interactive and was published by Majesco Entertainment. Players create and manage a team of BattleBots.

A sequel called BattleBots: Design & Destroy was released on August 31, 2003.

Gameplay
BattleBots: Beyond the BattleBox is an action game. Players control a radio-controlled robot and battle it out with other robots to win. The main game mode is Tournament mode, where the player competes in four matches depending on the weight class and must win all four to win an award. The player can also win sponsorships, to earn more money.

There are sixteen real-life robots in the game.

Reception

BattleBots: Beyond the BattleBox received "mixed" reviews according to the review aggregation website Metacritic. IGN said that the only good thing was that Carmen Electra was not in the game.

Sequel

BattleBots: Design & Destroy was released on August 31, 2003 for the Game Boy Advance. It was stated that the game was the sequel to BattleBots: Beyond the BattleBox; but it actually is the same game released under a different name, albeit with some bugs fixed. It was possible that the game was released to pick up sales from gamers mistaking it for the PC game Robot Arena 2: Design & Destroy.

Reception

Design & Destroy received "generally unfavorable reviews" according to Metacritic.

References

External links
 

2002 video games
Beyond the BattleBox
Game Boy Advance games
Game Boy Advance-only games
Majesco Entertainment games
Multiplayer and single-player video games
Robot combat video games
Video games developed in the United States
Pipe Dream Interactive games